Sawyeria marylandensis is a species of amoebae, placed in the monotypic genus Sawyeria, and belonging to the group Heterolobosea.

References

Amoebozoa genera
Monotypic eukaryote genera